Videm pri Lukovici is a small settlement south of Lukovica pri Domžalah in the eastern part of the Upper Carniola region of Slovenia.

Name
The name Videm comes from the Slovene common noun videm 'church property', borrowed from Middle High German videme 'church property' (originally, 'property left by the deceased to the church'). The name of the settlement was changed from Videm to Videm pri Lukovici (literally, 'Videm near Lukovica') in 1953.

References

External links

Videm pri Lukovici on Geopedia

Populated places in the Municipality of Lukovica